Northstar Group is a Singapore-based private equity fund manager firm dedicated to investing in growth companies in Indonesia and, to a lesser extent, other countries in Southeast Asia.

Northstar's investments include Gojek and Indomaret.

Business units 
 Hougang United FC
 PSBL Bandar Lampung
 Asia Systems Ltd.
 Argo Volantis Pte. Ltd
 Alfamart
 Garuda Indonesia
 PT GoTo Gojek Tokopedia Tbk (GoTo)
 PT Indosat Tbk (Indosat Ooredoo Hutchison)
 Greenfields
 UP Gen
 eFishery
 Topica
 APAC Realty Limited (APAC)
 Innovalues Pte Ltd (Innovalues)
 NERA Telecommunications Ltd (NERA)
 PT BFI Finance Indonesia Tbk (BFI Finance)
 PT Bank Tabungan Pensiunan Nasional Tbk (Bank BTPN)
 Indomaret
 PT Trimegah Sekuritas Indonesia Tbk (Trimegah Sekuritas)
 PT Centratama Telekomunikasi Indonesia Tbk (Centratama Group)
 Northstar Tambang Persada Ltd
 PT Delta Dunia Makmur Tbk (Delta Dunia)
 PT Banyubiru Sakti
 PT Bukit Makmur Mandiri Utama
 PT Pulau Mutiara Persada
 PT Asuransi Tugu Pratama Indonesia Tbk (Tugu Insurance)
 Northstar Foundation
 Lampung University

 Bali united
 Persib
 Surya esa perkasa tbk
 Bank Jago
 PT.Kino Indonesia Tbk
 Samudra Energy
 Pt.Trikomsel oke Tbk
 Pt.Delta Dunia Makmur Tbk

References

External links 
Northstar Group

Private equity firms of Singapore
Singaporean brands